Summertown is a city in Emanuel County, Georgia, United States. The population was 160 at the 2010 census.

History
Summertown was originally built up as a summer retreat, hence the name. The Georgia General Assembly incorporated Summertown as a town in 1906.

Geography

Summertown is located in northern Emanuel County at  (32.746532, -82.276182). Georgia State Route 56 passes through the east side of the city limits, leading north  to Midville and south  to Swainsboro, the county seat.

Demographics

As of the census of 2000, there were 140 people, 48 households, and 34 families residing in the town. The racial makeup of the town was 52.14% White, 39.29% African American, 3.57% Native American, 2.86% from other races, and 2.14% from two or more races. Hispanic or Latino of any race were 3.57% of the population.

There were 48 households, out of which 39.6% had children under the age of 18 living with them, 52.1% were married couples living together, 14.6% had a female householder with no husband present, and 27.1% were non-families. 25.0% of all households were made up of individuals, and 16.7% had someone living alone who was 65 years of age or older. The average household size was 2.92 and the average family size was 3.51.

In the town the population was spread out, with 34.3% under the age of 18, 5.7% from 18 to 24, 25.0% from 25 to 44, 20.0% from 45 to 64, and 15.0% who were 65 years of age or older. The median age was 33 years. For every 100 females, there were 125.8 males. For every 100 females age 18 and over, there were 109.1 males.

The median income for a household in the town was $35,750, and the median income for a family was $36,250. Males had a median income of $30,000 versus $19,583 for females. The per capita income for the town was $11,321. There were 5.9% of families and 12.3% of the population living below the poverty line, including 17.0% of under eighteens and 15.8% of those over 64.

References

External links
 Summerville historical marker

Cities in Emanuel County, Georgia
Cities in Georgia (U.S. state)